Megaroc was a British proposal for a crewed suborbital derivative of the V2 proposed by R. A. Smith of the British Interplanetary Society. The proposal was sent to the British Ministry of Supply on 23 December 1946. Though slightly smaller, the vehicle had a lot in common with the Mercury-Redstone Launch Vehicle that would put the first American in space some 15 years later. The vehicle was proposed several months after a similar V2-derived rocket, the Soviet Tikhonravov Suborbital proposal.

Though derived from the V2, very few parts remained in their original form. While the origin and turbo pumps were largely the same, their orientation was changed. The tankage was of greater radius and length to carry an increased fuel load party offset by a lighter payload. The stabilisation fins at the base of the V2 were removed and the rocket was made to spin slightly to improve stability. This is now a common feature of rockets, but was unusual for early rockets. The explosive warhead was replaced with an unpressurised capsule, the pilot relying on a suit for life support.

As the rocket climbed and acceleration built with the reduction in mass, the pilot could reduce the thrust to limit the g load to 3.3. Once above the dense atmosphere and after the main engine cut off, the capsule would separate from the main rocket body. Parachutes would be deployed very early in the return journey, at about 113 km, removing the need for heat shielding. The maximum altitude was over 304 km. Both the capsule and the main body would soft land and be capable of reuse.

It was recognised that there would need to be a period of development and risk reduction, this was estimated at 5 years and would have meant a first all-up flight in 1951 or 52.

The British government did not take the project forward. Instead, choosing to concentrate on Nuclear and conventional research which had a more immediate military use. The United Kingdom was effectively bankrupt after WW2 and there were only limited resources available but even when funds became easier the government mostly chose not to participate in space research except when derived relatively cheaply from military projects.

References

Space programme of the United Kingdom
Space launch vehicles of the United Kingdom
History of science and technology in the United Kingdom